Lewis Simmons  (1838–1911) was an American Major League Baseball manager for the 1886 Philadelphia Athletics of the American Association.

External links
Baseball Reference – Career Managerial Statistics
 Lew Simmons at SABR (Baseball BioProject)

1838 births
1911 deaths
Philadelphia Athletics (AA) managers
Sportspeople from Philadelphia
People from New Castle, Pennsylvania